Doris & the Daggers is a 2017 solo album from Spiral Stairs, formerly of Pavement and Preston School of Industry.

Reception

Doris & the Daggers received positive reviews from critics. On Metacritic, the album holds a score of 74/100 based on 13 reviews, indicating "generally favorable reviews."

Track listing
 "Dance (Cry Wolf)"
 "Emoshuns"
 "Dundee Man"
 "AWM"
 "No Comparison"
 "The Unconditional"
 "Trams (Stole My Love)"
 "Exiled Tonight"
 "Angel Eyes"
 "Doris and the Daggers"

References

2017 albums
Spiral Stairs albums
Domino Recording Company albums